Pálava is a variety of white wine grape developed in 1953 by Josef Veverka in Moravia. The variety is a genetic crossbreed of the Gewürztraminer and Müller Thurgau grape varieties.

The variety has not spread far beyond its homeland, outside of the Czech Republic is planted in Slovakia, albeit in small quantities. In 2018 it was grown in the Czech Republic on 594 hectares of vineyards, mostly (45%) in the Mikulov region.

Pálava wines are typically full-bodied, aromatic and subtly sweet. Their colour is golden-yellow.

See also 

 Czech wine
 List of grape varieties

References

External links 

 Pálava datasheet in Vitis International Variety Catalogue database

White wine grape varieties
Czech wine